José Pellicer Gandía (1912–1942) was a Spanish anarchist, politician and revolutionary primarily known for being the founder of the Iron Column during the Spanish Civil War. He is often nicknamed the "Durruti valencià".

Pellicer Gandía was executed on 8 June 1942 under the Francoist government, after several years of imprisonment.

Notes

Sources

 

1912 births
1942 deaths
Anarcho-syndicalists
Confederación Nacional del Trabajo members
People from Valencia
People of the Spanish Civil War
Spanish anarchists
Spanish politicians
Spanish revolutionaries

Executed anarchists